Tolstovo is a rural locality (a village) in Golovinskoye Rural Settlement, Sudogodsky District, Vladimir Oblast, Russia. The population was 5 as of 2010.

Geography 
Tolstovo is located 3 km south-west from Golovino, 36 km west of Sudogda (the district's administrative centre) by road. Rogovo is the nearest rural locality.

References 

Rural localities in Sudogodsky District